Sarah Jawaid, better known by her label name Sarah Gandapur, is a popular Pakistani fashion designer and Fashion journalist. She rose to prominence by exhibiting number of fashion shows and fashion weeks. She also debuted as a costume designer for films and was awarded ARY Film Award for Best Costume Design for Chambaili.

Personal life
Sarah was born Sarah Javed in Peshawar, Pakistan to Muslim parents. Her father wanted her to become a lawyer, but Sarah attended Lahore School of Fashion Design and opened her clothing label after graduating in 2005.

Career
Sarah started her career in 2005 after her graduation fashion designing. She started in-house studio and take orders on special demands, later in 2007 she established herself as one of leading fashion designers for women. At one point she started designing for men as well, but renewed her focus on clothing for women as by her own account men's clothing was not her forte.

Clothing line
Sarah designs only for Women, and has several exclusive clothing lines including:

 Eastern and western Pret Line
 Eastern and western Couture line.
 Bridal line.

Additionally, she has hosted many International and National fashion weeks, including PFDC Sunsilk Fashion Weeks. Apart from clothes, Sarah has designed home accessories like cushions and bed covers. She serves both international and domestic clients.

Costume Designing
In an interview with Fashion Central Sarah said: 
"In the first demonstration of my skills, I did a presentation on "18th century Victorian costumes". The effort turned out to be a herculean one, yet I went through enough research and effort to demonstrate my capabilities. And as a result I reaped the rewards. The designs became an instant success in the shape of acceptance by the well known Shah Sharabeel. I was given go ahead to produce costumes for his play The Phantom Of Opera, and suddenly, from obscurity I was propelled into a world of acclaim and lauded with praise  and  applause." - Fashion Central

She produced costumes for 2013 acclaimed movie Chambaili, for which she won an ARY Film Award for Best Costume Design.

Awards and honors
Sarah won numerous awards for participating in international fashion weeks and exhibitions, and was awarded "Best youngest fashion Journalist" on International Women's Day at the 3rd Sukh Chan and Wellness club awards. She also served as the youngest Jury member three times for Lux Style Awards in selecting fashion awards winners. She won an award for Best Costume Designer for Chambaili at the ARY Film Awards 2014.

References

External links
 
 
 

People from Peshawar
People from Lahore
Pakistani fashion designers
Pakistani women fashion designers
Living people
Year of birth missing (living people)